Phrynobatrachus stewartae, also known as the Stewart's puddle frog or Stewart's river frog, is a species of frog in the family Phrynobatrachidae. It is found in northern Malawi and south-central and western Tanzania. The specific name stewartae honours Margaret M. Stewart, an American herpetologist who wrote "Amphibians of Malawi" (1967) and collected the type series, originally identified as Phrynobatrachus gutturosus.

Description
The finger and toe tips are not expanded into discs. The toes are broadly webbed. The femoral glands are elongated and flattened, and conspicuous yellow in males. Males have a baggy vocal sac with a clear posterior flap. The upper and lower jaws are barred. The gular region is greyish in males but speckled in females.

Habitat and conservation
It is especially found in areas where aquatic vegetation is present. Breeding presumably takes place in marshes and well-vegetated, standing bodies of water. Its habitat in Tanzania is threatened by habitat degradation caused by conversion to agriculture or by overharvesting. While it exhibits a degree of tolerance to modified habitats, it is poorly understood to what extent this species is threatened by expanding agriculture. It is present in the Mulenge Forest Reserve and the Katavi National Park, and it is likely to occur in the Nyika National Park that is close to its type locality.

References

stewartae
Frogs of Africa
Amphibians of Malawi
Amphibians of Tanzania
Taxa named by Donald George Broadley
Amphibians described in 1985
Taxonomy articles created by Polbot